Edward Appleby (born 21 December 2004) is an English figure skater. He is the Junior Grand Prix France II 2021 bronze medalist, 2020 Mentor Toruń Cup junior men's champion, and two-time British junior national champion 2020 & 2022).

Personal life 
Edward Appleby was born in Colchester. His older brother, Elliot, is also a figure skater and competes in men's and pairs.

Career

Early years 
Appleby began learning to skate in 2009. In October 2018, he debuted on the ISU Junior Grand Prix (JGP) circuit, finishing 18th in Ljubljana, Slovenia. He placed 36th at the 2019 World Junior Championships and 26th at the 2020 World Junior Championships.

2021–22 season 
In late August, Appleby won bronze in Courchevel, France, at the second event of the 2021–22 ISU Junior Grand Prix season. In April, he qualified to the final segment at the 2022 World Junior Championships in Tallinn, Estonia. Ranked 18th in the short and 21st in the free, he finished 20th overall.

Programs

Competitive highlights 
CS: Challenger Series; JGP: Junior Grand Prix

References

External links 
 

2004 births
Living people
English male single skaters
Sportspeople from Colchester